Miss Philippines Earth 2022 was the 22nd edition of the Miss Philippines Earth pageant. It was held in Coron, Palawan on August 6, 2022.

At the end of the event, Naelah Alshorbaji from Parañaque City crowned Jenny Ramp of Santa Ignacia, Tarlac as Miss Philippines Earth 2022. With her crowned are the court of elemental queens: Jimema Tempra as Miss Philippines Air, Angel Santos as  Miss Philippines Water, Erika Tan as Miss Philippines Fire, and Nice Lampad as Miss Philippines Eco Tourism. Ramp will represent the Philippines in Miss Earth 2022.

Results
Color Key

Contestants
34 contestants representing various cities, municipalities, provinces, and communities abroad will compete for the title.

References

External links
 Official Miss Philippines Earth website

Beauty pageants in the Philippines
2022
Earth, Philippines
2022 in the Philippines